The miombo wren-warbler (Calamonastes undosus), also known as the miombo barred warbler or pale wren-warbler, is a species of bird in the family Cisticolidae found in southern Africa.

Some authorities have also included Stierling's wren-warbler in this species.

References

miombo wren-warbler
Birds of Southern Africa
miombo wren-warbler
Taxonomy articles created by Polbot